Rosalie Gautier (26 March 1878 – 5 October 1954), Rose Féart on stage, was a Franco-Swiss singer (soprano) and singing teacher.

Biography 
Rose Fréart was born in Saint-Riquier. Her father was a sugar industrialist. Shortly after the birth of his daughter, he returned to his hometown of Argenton-sur-Creuse, where Rose Féart spent her entire childhood. Sent to Paris to continue her musical studies, she won the first prize of the Conservatoire de Musique in lyrical declamation on 2 August 1902, at the age of 24.

Her soprano voice was noticed by the Opéra de Paris who immediately engaged her. Rose Féart became one of the most important opera singers for the great repertoire, especially in Wagnerian roles, and worked with composers of her time such as Massenet, Fauré, Debussy, César Franck, and André Caplet. Her career developed quickly, in operas and concerts, and lasted 20 years, in France and Switzerland as well as in other major opera houses in Europe.

She died in Geneva on 5 October 1954 aged 76.

Roles 
 1902: Don Giovanni, Mozart (Donna Anna), Opéra de Paris
 1903: Les Huguenots, Meyerbeer (Valentine), Opéra de Paris; Tannhäuser, Wagner (Elisabeth), Opéra de Paris; Le prophète, Meyerbeer (Berthe), Opéra de Paris
 1904: Il trovatore, Verdi (Leonora), Opéra de Paris
 1904/1905: Tristan und Isolde, Wagner (Brangäne), stage creation at the Paris Opera House
 1905: Armide, Gluck (La Haine), Opéra de Paris; Ariane, Massenet (Phèdre), Opéra de Paris
 1906: La Gloire de Corneille (cantata), Saint-Saëns; Armide (La Haine), Messager conductor, at Covent Garden; Lohengrin, Wagner (Ortrude), Opéra de Paris; Die Walküre, Wagner (Brünhilde), Opéra de Paris 
 1908: Prométhée, Fauré (Bia), direction Fauré, premiered in Paris at the hippodrome de Paris then Opéra de Paris; Aida, Verdi, Opéra de Paris; Rédemption, Édouard Blanc (L'Ange), direction Messager, Conservatoire de Paris
 1908/1909: Götterdämmerung, Wagner (Gutrune), direction Messager, stage premiere at the Opéra de Paris; Lohengrin (Elsa), Opéra de Paris
 1909 : Pelléas et Mélisande, Debussy (Mélisande), premiere at Covent Garden septuor pour quatuor à cordes et trois voix féminines, André Caplet, premiere, Criquebeuf-en-Caux
 1910: La Damoiselle élue, Debussy, direction Messager
 1911: Rose Féart was chosen by Debussy to create his Martyre de Saint Sébastien (La Vierge Érigone) at the Théâtre du Châtelet but, at the last moment, she abandoned the production which provoked religious tinted controversy, and was replaced by her double, a debutant lyrical soprano spotted by Debussy, Ninon Vallin, who was successful at the premiere and thus began her great international career, which led Rose Féart to take over her role when she witnessed Vallin's success; Lohengrin (Elsa)
 1913: Der Freischütz, Carl Maria von Weber, conductor Felix Weingartner, Théâtre des Champs-Élysées; Boris Godunov, Mussorgsky, conductor Inghelbrecht, Théâtre des Champs-Élysées; Poèmes Indous pour soprano et dix instruments, Maurice Delage, premiere
 1914: Le Vieux Coffret, pour voix et piano, André Caplet, premiere, Yport
 1914/1918: Rose Féart multiplied patriotic recitals during the war, including at Argention-sur-Creuse where she stayed with her family
 1916: Mélodie pour harpe, André Caplet, premiere, at Les Éparges
 1918: Détresse, for voice and piano, André Caplet, premiere. Called by Albert Paychère to make a replacement for the Alceste by Gluck at the Grand Théâtre de Genève, she won a triumph and conquered the public's admiration and affection. She moved to Geneva where she stayed for the rest of her life, becoming a Swiss citizen.
 1919/1920: Pelléas et Mélisande (Mélisande) and Don Giovanni (Donna Anna) in Geneva
 Armide, Lohengrin and Iphigénie en Tauride by Gluck, the three in Geneva
 1921: concerts with arias of Armide and a song cycle by Maurice Emmanuel including Odelettes Anacréoniques, Conservatoire de Paris
 1921/1922: last season at the Grand Théâtre de Genève. The soprano was then 44 years old.
 1922: Iphigénie en Tauride, Chorégies d'Orange
 1923: Le Martyre de Saint Sébastien, Grand Théâtre de Genève Armide, Chorégies d'Orange.

Rose Féart then devoted herself to a career as a singing teacher at the Conservatoire de Musique de Genève where she taught until her death at the age of 76. Mezzo-soprano Hélène Morath was one of her students and succeeded Rose Féart's faculty position at the Haute École de musique de Genève from 1960 to 1984.

Iconography 
Many photographs of Rose Féart in stage dress have been preserved.

Homage 
 Jean Cocteau, six poésies dédiées à Rose Féart, 1920, set in music  by Arthur Honegger, salle Pleyel, Paris, 1926

Bibliography 
 
 Rose Féart, Christophe Delhoume
 Histoire du Grand Théâtre de Genève, Roger de Candolle
 "Rose Féart, une diva, in Personnages ayant marqué la ville d'Argenton-sur-Creuse et sa région, Jean Anatole, 171 pp., Le Trépan, Argenton-sur-Creuse, 2007
 "Rose Féart" in Argentonnais connus et méconnus, Cercle d'histoire d'Argenton-sur-Creuse, Argenton, 2010
 Encyclopédie Larousse, article sur Maurice Delage
 "Rose Féart", in Argenton de A à Z en 44 rubriques historiques, 175 pp., Imprimerie Bonnamour, Argenton-sur-Creuse, 2013 .

References

External links 
 Rose Féart on isoldes-liebestod.net

French operatic sopranos
French music educators
Conservatoire de Paris alumni
1878 births
1954 deaths
People from Somme (department)
20th-century French women opera singers
Women music educators